During World War II, Nazi Germany created military-led regimes in occupied territories which were known as a Military administration or Military administration authority. These differed from Reichskommissariate which were led by Nazi Party officials. A Military administration was normally led by a "military commander" (official acronym MilBfh.).

Ranks

Officials of the Military administration, regardless serving in the Wehrmacht, war economy, military education facilities, or in the military-led regimes in occupied territories, etc., wore military rank insignias similar to these of the Wehrmacht, characterised by the main corps colour (de: Hauptfarbe) dark-green, and various secondary colours (de: Nebenfarben) as well.

Here are a select few of ranks in the Military administration.
 General-senior-staff intendant (de: Generaloberstabsintendant  [equivalent OF8, three-star rank]); corps colour "deep red" to army officials with general officer rank
 Ministerial director (Ministerialdirektor, equivalent to OF7, two-star rank); corps colour "deep red" to army officials with general officer rank
 Corps´ intendant (Korpsintendant, equivalent to OF6, one-star rank); corps colour "deep red" to army officials with general officer rank
 Senior-war court principal (Oberkriegsgerichtsrat, equivalent to OF5, colonel rank); corps colour "light blue" to officials of the military judicial system
 Senior intendancy principal (Oberintendanturrat, equivalent to OF4, lieutenant colonel rank); corps colour "carmine" to officials in staff appointments
 Remonte head official (Remontenamtsvorsteher, equivalent to OF3, major rank); corps colour "yellow" to remonte officials
 Staff pharmacist (Stabsapotheker, equivalent to OF2, captain rank); corps colour "light green" to army officials of pharmaceuticals
 Army judicial inspector (Heeresjustizinspektor, equivalent OF1a, 1st lieutenant rank); corps colour "light blue" to officials of the military judicial system
 Weapon master (Waffenmeister equivalent OF1b, 2nd lieutenant rank); corps colour "black" to army officials of technical appointment ranks
 Army weapon master (Heereswekmeister equivalent WO2, Oberfähnrich (NVA) rank); corps colour "black" to army officials in technical appointment rank
 Store master (Magazinmeister equivalent WO2, Fähnrich (NVA) rank); corps colour "black" to army officials in technical appointment rank

Locations
 Military Administration in Belgium and Northern France (in German: «Militärverwaltung in Belgien und Nordfrankreich»)
 Military Administration in France (in German: «Militärverwaltung in Frankreich»)
 Military Administration in Greece (in German: «Militärverwaltung in Griechenland»)
 Military Administration of Luxembourg (in German: «Militärverwaltung Luxemburg»)
 Military Administration in Serbia (in German: «Militärverwaltung in Serbien»)
 Military Administration in the Soviet Union (in German: «Militärverwaltung in der Sowjetunion»), divided into Operational zones («Operationszone Ost») directly behind the front, and Army Rear Areas («Rückwärtige Heeresgebieten») further away.
 Military Administration in Poland (in German: «Militärverwaltung in Polen»), later divided into territories which were directly annexed into Germany, and the General Government («Generalgouvernement»).

See also
Reichskommissariat
German-occupied Europe

References

Subdivisions of Nazi Germany
Occupied territories
Territories under military occupation
Military occupation